Orduspor Women's Basketball is the women basketball section of Orduspor, a major sports club in Ordu, Turkey.

Achievements

Current roster

References

External links
 Official website
 Profile at Twitter

Women's basketball teams in Turkey
Sport in Ordu
Basketball teams established in 2011